Rasputin is a 2011 Italian film directed by Louis Nero.

Cast
Francesco Cabras as Grigorij Efimovič Rasputin
 Daniele Savoca as prince Feliks Feliksovič Jusupov
 Franco Nero as narrator
 Marco Sabatino as Dmitrij Pavlovič Romanov
 Valerio Portale as Suhotin
 Diana Dell'Erba as Aleksandra Fëdorovna Romanova
 Anna Cuculo as Marianna
 Ottaviano Blitch as Jakov Michajlovič Jurovskij
 Anara Bayanova as Khioniya Guseva
 Ola Cavagna as Olga Lothina
 Elena Presti as Matrena Rasputina
 Davide Ranieri as prince Andronikov
 Matilde Maggio as Fon Den
 Toni Pandolfo as Police Officer's
 Riccardo Cicogna as Andronikov butler's
 Ruggero Romano as Aleksej Nikolaevič Romanov
 Roberto Pitta as Officer Vlasiuk

References

External links
 
 

Italian biographical drama films
Films directed by Louis Nero
Films set in Russia
Biographical films about Russian royalty
Films about Grigori Rasputin
2010s Italian-language films
2010s Italian films